Senator Dyson may refer to:

Fred Dyson (born 1939), Alaska State Senate
Roy Dyson (born 1948), Maryland State Senate
Thomas A. Dyson (1851–1898), Wisconsin State Senate